Oak Grove is an unincorporated community in Trigg County, in the U.S. state of Kentucky.

History
The community was named for oak trees near the original town site. The community contains Oak Grove Baptist Church, which dates back to 1875.

References

Unincorporated communities in Trigg County, Kentucky